Second Hand Rose may refer to:

"Second Hand Rose" (song), 1921 song made popular by Fanny Brice and later associated with Barbra Streisand
Second Hand Rose (band), Chinese rock band
Second Hand Rose (film), 1922 American film directed by Lloyd Ingraham